The Škoda 14Tr is a Czech trolleybus that was produced from 1981 to 1998. Prototypes were built in 1972 and 1974.

After the unsuccessful attempt to merge the Karosa ŠM 11 bus and the Škoda T 11 trolleybus and the cancelled Škoda 13Tr project, a new style of trolleybus was designed in the early 1970s, designated the 14Tr. Development was halted because of plans to replace trolleybuses by diesel buses, but the 1973 oil crisis led to a re-evaluation and work on the 14Tr resumed.

Škoda 14Tr trolleybus, at least in the former USSR, became the successor to the Škoda 9Tr (the 10Tr and 13Tr models remained in the projects, 11Tr was released only in single copies, and the Škoda 12Tr was called the trolleybus train of the two Škoda 9Tr trolleybuses).

Description 
The 14Tr is a two-axle trolleybus with unibody construction. Its structure consists of mutually welded elements: the frame, side walls, roof and ends. Each component is welded together from steel shapes and castings. The body is covered with a steel skin; the section below the windows is thermally insulated and soundproofed. The interior is surfaces with plastic paneling. Domestic buses have three twin-leaf folding doors on the right side, while export units only have two. Transverse passenger seats are covered in leatherette.

Electrical equipment uses the same thyristor pulse control as the 9Tr trolleybus.

Early history 
One of the first modifications of 14Tr - two 14Tr0 cars (001 and 002) arrived for testing in Kyiv in 1981. One of the cars had a RCSU (rheostat-contactor control system), the second had a TISU (thyristor-pulse control system) which in the late 1970s was a new innovation.

The difference from RCSU was that instead of a start-brake resistor, controlled by a rotating shaft with contacts, an electric motor was controlled by a thyristor control unit. Thyristor operation was controlled by a control regulator, so the trolleybus car started driving off more smoothly. TISU made possible to recover power - the return part of the electricity consumed by the trolleybus back to the trolleybus power network (see regenerative braking), which reduced operating cost.

Both Škoda 14Tr0 after testing in Kyiv were deployed to Crimea to be used in a long-distance trolleybus route. 001 was used in the Alushta trolleybus depot until it burned down in 1995. 002 was used in Simferopol trolleybus depot and in other depot, where it remains there, but only for training purposes. The prototype was decommissioned and scrapped in 2009.

Production and operation 

Between 1972 and 1998, 3,263 14Tr trolleybuses were built, plus two bodies that were used for the prototype TV-14Tr trolley-train (a total of 3,265 units). The largest number of cars - 354 were sent to Kyiv. The capital favored Soviet-made trolleybuses and there were no large trolleybus systems in Czechoslovakia itself.

Electric Transit, Inc.

From 1994 to 2004, Electric Transit, Inc. (a joint venture between Škoda and AAI Corporation) assembled 297 14Tr-based trolleybuses for the transit operators in two cities of the United States: Dayton, Ohio and San Francisco, designated 14TrE/E2 ("E" for "E"xport) and 14TrSF ("S"an "F"rancisco), respectively. To meet "Buy America" requirements for federally-subsidized transit vehicle purchases, incomplete "shells" were manufactured at the Škoda plant in the Czech Republic and shipped to an American facility in Hunt Valley, Maryland for initial fitting-out. Final fitting-out was performed at leased facilities in the client cities.

Summary

14TrM production started in 1995 and continued until 2002. A planned order for Gatchina, Russia was cancelled when construction of the trolleybus system stopped in 2005.

References

See also 

Buses of the Czech Republic
Trolleybuses
Škoda vehicles
Vehicles introduced in 1981